Thomas Etholen Selfridge (February 8, 1882 – September 17, 1908) was a first lieutenant in the U.S. Army and the first person to die in an airplane crash. He was also the first active-duty member of the U.S. military to die in a crash while on duty. He was killed while seated as a passenger in a Wright Flyer, on a demonstration flight piloted by Orville Wright.

Biography
Selfridge was born on February 8, 1882, in San Francisco, California. He was the nephew of Rear Admiral Thomas Oliver Selfridge Jr., who was the son of another Rear Admiral, Thomas Oliver Selfridge Sr. He graduated from the United States Military Academy in 1903, and received his commission in the Artillery Corps. He was 31st in a class of 96; Douglas MacArthur was first. In 1907, when the Artillery Corps was separated into the Field Artillery and Coast Artillery Corps, Selfridge was assigned to the 5th Field Artillery Regiment and the following year to the 1st Field Artillery Regiment.

Selfridge was stationed at the Presidio during the great San Francisco earthquake of April 18, 1906. His unit participated in search and rescue, as well as cleanup operations. In 1907, he was assigned to the Aeronautical Division, U.S. Signal Corps at Fort Myer, Virginia, where he was later instructed in flying a dirigible. He was also the United States government representative to the Aerial Experiment Association (AEA), which was chaired by Alexander Graham Bell, and he became its first secretary.

Selfridge took his first flight on December 6, 1907, on Bell's tetrahedral kite, the Cygnet, made of 3,393 winged cells. It took him  in the air above Bras d'Or Lake in Nova Scotia, Canada, and flew for 7 minutes. This was the first recorded passenger flight of any heavier-than-air craft in Canada.

Selfridge designed Red Wing, the AEA's first powered aircraft. On March 12, 1908, the Red Wing, piloted by Frederick W. Baldwin, raced over the frozen surface of Keuka Lake near Hammondsport, New York, on runners, and managed to fly  before crashing. Red Wing was destroyed in a crash on its second flight on March 17, 1908, and only the engine could be salvaged.

Although not fully trained as a pilot, Selfridge was nevertheless the first U.S. military officer to fly any airplane unaccompanied.

In August 1908, Selfridge was one of three pilots trained to fly the Army Dirigible Number One, purchased by the US Army from Thomas Scott Baldwin in July 1908; his training partners were Lieutenants Frank P. Lahm and Benjamin Foulois. The dirigible was scheduled to fly from Fort Omaha, Nebraska, to exhibitions at the Missouri State Fair in Sedalia, Missouri, piloted by Foulois and Selfridge.The Army had tentatively agreed, however, to purchase an airplane from the Wright Brothers and had scheduled the acceptance trials in September. Selfridge, with an interest in both heavier-than-air and lighter-than-air ships, obtained an appointment and traveled to Fort Myer, Virginia.

Death

In September 1908, Orville Wright visited Fort Myer to demonstrate the 1908 Wright Military Flyer for the US Army Signal Corps division. On September 17, Selfridge arranged to be his passenger, and Wright piloted the craft.

Halfway through the fifth circuit, at 5:14 in the afternoon, the right-hand propeller broke, losing thrust. This set up a vibration, causing the split propeller to hit a guy-wire bracing the rear vertical rudder. The wire tore out of its fastening and shattered the propeller; the rudder swiveled to the horizontal and sent the Flyer into a nose dive. Both men were thrown forward against the remaining wires, and Selfridge struck one of the wooden uprights of the framework, fracturing the base of his skull. He underwent neurosurgery, but died three hours later without regaining consciousness. Wright suffered severe injuries, including a broken left femur, several broken ribs, and a damaged hip, and was hospitalized for seven weeks.

Orville Wright later described the fatal accident in a letter to his brother, Wilbur Wright:

Two photographs taken of the Flyer just prior to the flight show that Selfridge was not wearing any headgear, while Wright was only wearing a cap. Following the crash, due to speculation that Selfridge would have survived had he worn headgear, first pilots of the US Army were instructed to wear large heavy headgear reminiscent of early football helmets.

Thomas Selfridge was buried in Arlington National Cemetery in Section 3 Gravesite 2158, adjacent to Joint Base Myer-Henderson Hall.

Legacy

Selfridge Air National Guard Base is named after him. The base is located in Harrison Township, Michigan, near Mt. Clemens, 22 miles from downtown Detroit, Michigan (from the US Port of Entry at the Detroit-Windsor Tunnel).

Though buried in Arlington National Cemetery, Selfridge is memorialized by a large cenotaph in Section XXXIV of West Point Cemetery.

The damaged propeller of the Wright Flyer wrecked at Fort Myer can be viewed at the National Museum of the United States Air Force, at Wright-Patterson Air Force Base, in Dayton, Ohio.

In 1965, Selfridge was posthumously inducted into the National Aviation Hall of Fame in Dayton, Ohio. 

A gate between Arlington National Cemetery and Joint Base Myer-Henderson Hall, located roughly halfway between the two chapels on Joint Base Myer-Henderson Hall, is named Selfridge Gate, in his honor.

See also
List of fatalities from aviation accidents
List of firsts in aviation
Otto Lilienthal, glider death
Percy Pilcher, glider crash
Daniel J. Maloney, glider death
George E. M. Kelly, first American military pilot to die in an airplane crash while piloting
Eugene Lefebvre, first pilot to be killed

References

Further reading 
Washington Post; May 13, 1908 "Selfridge Aerodrome Sails Steadily for 319 Feet. At 25 to 30 miles an Hour. First Public Trip of Heavier-than-air Car in America. Professor Alexander Graham Bell's New Machine, Built After Plans by Lieutenant Selfridge, Shown to Be Practicable by Flight Over Keuka Lake. Portion of Tail Gives Way, Bringing the Test to an End. Views of an Expert. Hammondsport, New York, March 12, 1908. Professor Alexander Graham Bell's new aeroplane, the Red Wing, was given its test flight over Lake Keuka today by F. W. Baldwin, the engineer in charge of its construction. The machine was built by the Aerial Experiment Association for Lieut. Thomas Selfridge, U.S.A."
Washington Post; May 2, 1909 "Plans Monument to Son. E.A. Selfridge to Erect Shaft to Young Aviator in Arlington. E.A. Selfridge, father of the late Lieut. Thomas Selfridge, of the signal corps, the young officer who lost his life September 19 last when the Wright aeroplane collapsed in midair above the Fort Myer parade ground, has been in the city for several days to arrange the details for the monument to be erected to the memory of his son in Arlington National Cemetery."

External links 

 
 
 
 
 
 
 
 
Thomas Selfridge sits in Wright Flyer before the fatal flight, Orville cranking engine

1882 births
1908 deaths
Accidental deaths in Virginia
Alexander Graham Bell
American balloonists
American test pilots
Aviation history of the United States
Aviators from California
Aviators killed in aviation accidents or incidents in the United States
Burials at Arlington National Cemetery
National Aviation Hall of Fame inductees
1906 San Francisco earthquake survivors
United States Army officers
United States Military Academy alumni
Victims of aviation accidents or incidents in 1908
Wright brothers